is a Japanese professional footballer who plays as an attacking midfielder for J1 League club Cerezo Osaka.

Career statistics

Club
.

Notes

References

External links

Profile at Cerezo Osaka

2004 births
Living people
Association football people from Wakayama Prefecture
Japanese footballers
Japan youth international footballers
Association football midfielders
J3 League players
J1 League players
Cerezo Osaka players
Cerezo Osaka U-23 players